Lockheed interceptor may refer to :
 Lockheed P-38 Lightning,
 Lockheed YF-12, a prototype interceptor aircraft.